Lisa Raymond and Rennae Stubbs were the defending champions, but Raymond did not compete in this edition. Stubbs teamed up with Elena Bovina and lost in quarterfinals to Virginia Ruano Pascual and Paola Suárez.

Virginia Ruano Pascual and Paola Suárez won the title, defeating Janette Husárová and Conchita Martínez 6–0, 6–3 in the final. It was the 19th title for Ruano Pascual and the 26th title for Suárez in their respective careers.

Seeds
The first four seeds received a bye into the second round.

Draw

Finals

Top half

Bottom half

External links
 Main and Qualifying draws

Family Circle Cup
Charleston Open